Shushila Takao (born 4 November 1986) is a New Zealand actress and model, best known for her roles in television series such as Tatau, Filthy Rich, and The Shannara Chronicles.

Early life
Takao was born in Christchurch and raised in Nelson. She is of Māori, Indian, and French descent.

Career
In 2015, Takao played her first major television role as Aumea Vaipiti on the series Tatau. The show was set in the Cook Islands and consisted of 8 episodes. She went on to be cast as Ariana in the New Zealand based television drama series Filthy Rich. She played the role of The Changeling on the American-based television series The Shannara Chronicles.

Filmography

Film

Television

References

External links
 

1986 births
Living people
New Zealand film actresses
New Zealand television actresses
New Zealand Māori actresses
New Zealand Māori people
New Zealand people of Indian descent
New Zealand people of French descent